Moulay Abul Mahasin Abu Abdallah Mohammed Amghar (ca 1060) was a Moroccan idriside Sufi saint during the reign of the Almoravid dynasty and the founder of the Taifa Sanhajiya, the earliest example of a Sufi order in the  Maghrib. He is also the patron saint of Tit, a small village 12 kilometers from El Jadida. After 1083 Abu Abdallah became head of Ribat Tit-n-Fitr, which was founded by his father Abu Jaafar Amghar. His son and successor Sidi Abu Abdelkhaliq Amghar (d. 614/1199), enjoyed a close relationship with the Almohad caliph Yaqub al-Mansur, who supported Ribat Tit al-Fitr financially. One of Abu Abdallah's descendants (shaykh Abu Abdullah Muhammad Ibn Amghar as-Saghir) was the spiritual master of Al-Jazuli. A moussem in honour of Moulay Abu Abdallah Amghar is celebrated each year in El Jadida.

External links
Darr-sir.com: Moroccan Maraboutism, see "5. Ribat Tit al-Fitr" retrieved on 04-22-2008
The moussem of El Jadida (mainly in French) retrieved on 04-22-2008

References

Ahmet T. Karamustafa, Sufism: The Formative Period, p148
Vincent J. Cornell, Realm of the Saint: Power and Authority in Moroccan Sufism 1998, p. 45
The famous scholar Ibn Qunfudh also wrote on Abdallah Amghar. The book of his journeys in Morocco is entitled Uns al-faqir wa 'izz al-haqir, "the Convivial Company of the Wandering Poor and the Honorable Strength of the Contemptible." It can be found in the Royal Archives in Rabat: Bibliothèque Royal de Rabat N° 365, Madrid N° 186 (1406), Le Caire N°46. Bibliothèque Royal Rabat 8288-5354-3978

Moroccan Sufis
Year of birth unknown
Year of death unknown

Berber Moroccans
11th-century Berber people
Berber Muslims